RAM Music Machine was a hardware add-on for the ZX Spectrum and Amstrad CPC464/664 released in 1986. It was more advanced than the earlier SpecDrum and it could play melody samples, drum patterns or be used as an echo. You could sample your own sounds in 19,444 samples a second and use them. It also had MIDI ports to connect to synthesisers. The price on introduction was £50.

See also 
 SpecDrum

References 

Drum machines
ZX Spectrum
Musical instruments invented in the 1980s